The Transjordan memorandum was a British memorandum passed by the Council of the League of Nations on 16 September 1922, as an addendum to the British Mandate for Palestine.

The memorandum described how the British government planned to implement Article 25 of the Mandate,  without applying the provisions regarding Jewish settlement.

Background

 in Ma'an, Captain Alex Kirkbride until the arrival in November 1920 of Abdullah bin al-Hussein, the future Emir. Following the expulsion of Faisal bin Hussein from Syria by the French in July 1920, and the subsequent Cairo Conference, March 1921 they appointed Hussein Emir of Transjordan, while assuring that no Jews would be allowed to settle in Transjordan.

Article 25
Article 25 of the Mandate for Palestine allowed for the exclusion of Transjordan from unspecified provisions of the Mandate. On 16 September 1922, Lord Balfour, representing the United Kingdom, reminded the Council of the League of Nations of Article 25 of the Mandate for Palestine (which had been previously approved but had not yet come into effect). He then told the council that the British government now proposed to carry out this article, as had always been intended by the League of Nations and the British government. He then presented a memorandum for approval.

Borders
The border between the territory of Transjordan and Mandatory Palestine was defined for the first time in the memorandum, as follows:
all territory lying to the east of a line drawn from a point two miles west of the town of Akaba on the Gulf of that name up the centre of the Wady Araba, Dead Sea and River Jordan to its junction with the River Yarmuk: thence up the centre of that river to the Syrian frontier.
The same boundary had been specified by the High Commissioner in September as the line delimiting the region to which the Palestine Order in Council applied.

Exclusions and application of the Mandate
The memorandum listed as exclusions articles 4, 6, 13, 14, 22, 23, and parts of the Preamble and Articles 2, 7 and 11, including the articles of the Mandate concerning a Jewish national home. It concluded with:
In the application of the Mandate to Transjordan, the action which, in Palestine, is taken by the Administration of the latter country will be taken by the Administration of Transjordan under the general supervision of the Mandatory. His Majesty's Government accept full responsibility as Mandatory for Transjordan, and undertake that such provision as may be made for the administration of that territory in accordance with Article 25 of the Mandate shall be in no way inconsistent with those provisions of the Mandate which are not by this resolution declared inapplicable.

From that point onwards, Britain administered the part west of the Jordan as Palestine, and the part east of the Jordan as Transjordan. Technically they remained one mandate covering 2 territories but most official documents nonetheless referred to them as if they were two separate mandates. In May 1923 Transjordan was granted internal self-government with Abdullah as ruler and Harry St. John Philby as chief representative.

Notes

External links
 
"The Palestine Order in Council"/"Palestine Legislative Council Election Order", 10 August 1922
The international law foundations of Palestinian nationality: a legal examination of nationality in Palestine under Britain's rule
Jordan – History: The making of Transjordan, King Hussein's official page
U.S. Library of Congress country study

Documents of Mandatory Palestine
Emirate of Transjordan
1922 documents
1922 in international relations
1922 in the British Empire
1922 in Transjordan
Documents of the United Kingdom